Lukas Frick (born September 15, 1994) is a Swiss professional ice hockey defenseman who is currently playing with Lausanne HC of the National League (NL). He previously played with EHC Kloten.

Playing career
Frick made his National League debut with EHC Kloten during the 2012–13 season. He went on to play 5 seasons with the team, winning the 2017 Swiss Cup.

On April 10, 2017, Frick joined Lausanne HC on a four-year deal worth CHF 2 million.

On September 24, 2020, Frick was signed to a four-year contract extension by Lausanne HC.

International play

Frick was named to Switzerland men's national team for the 2018 and 2019 IIHF World Championship.

Career statistics

Regular season and playoffs

International

References

External links

1994 births
Living people
EHC Kloten players
Lausanne HC players
Swiss ice hockey defencemen
Sportspeople from the canton of St. Gallen